Katia Forbert Petersen (born 6 February 1949) is a Polish-Danish cinematographer, film director, producer, and writer, known for her work on the Danish-language films En fremmed piges dagbog (1989), Behind the Mountains (2004), and My Iranian Paradise (2008), among others.

Petersen has been involved in approximately 150 documentary and feature films over her career, and has done work for Zweites Deutsches Fernsehen in Germany and the National Film Board of Canada.

Career
The daughter of Polish engineer and cinematographer Wladyslaw Forbert, Petersen spent her early career studying cinematography at the National Film School in Łódź, Poland. In response to the mounting anti-Semitic political crisis in Poland, Petersen emigrated to Denmark, where she held dual citizenship, after receiving her degree in 1969.

Petersen joined the Danish Film Institute in 1973. Soon after, she managed cinematography for three feminist feature films: the Danish film Take It Like a Man, Madam (1975), and two German films: The Power of Men is the Patience of Women (1978) and Redupers: The All-Round Reduced Personality (1978). Since then, she has filmed and directed numerous feature and documentary productions in Denmark and abroad.

Petersen is a frequent collaborator of fellow Danish women directors Annette Mari Olsen and Mette Knudsen.  In 1988, Petersen and Olsen founded the production company Sfinx Film/TV, through which the duo continues to produce films together.

Filmography

Awards
 Bronze Medal, New York Television Festival, 1990 for A Wanted Child
 Gold Medal, Prix National, Festival de la Commission des Communauts Europennes, 1990 for A Pig after My Own Heart
 Special Commendation Non-fiction, Television Programme of the Year, Prix Europa, 1991 for Madsen's Hotel
 Special Commendation for Serials and Documentary Miniseries, Prix Europa, 1992 for You Have to be Round to Live in a Globe
 Danish Association of Cinematographers Annual Award, 1992
 Best Director, European Youth Film Festival, Antwerp, 1997
 Grand Prix, ITVA-Festival, Copenhagen, 1997 for Two Women on a River
 Special Prize for Best Television Documentary, Prix Europa, 1997 for They Don't Burn Priests, Do They?
 Special Commendation, Prix Niki, 1997 for They Don't Burn Priests, Do They?
 2nd Prize, Nordic Glory Festival, Finland, 1997 for They Don't Burn Priests, Do They?
 Best Documentary and Best Photography, ITVA-Festival, New Orleans, 1998 for Two Women on a River
 Aller Press Prize, 1999 for The Time Before the Moment
 Women's International Film and Television Showcase - Honorary Golden Mermaid, 2001
 Jury Prize, Taiwan International Children's Film Festival, 2004 for When Mum and Dad are Clowns
 Jury Prize, Taiwan International Children's Film Festival, 2006 for Behind the Mountains
 Robert Award for Best Documentary Short, 2007 for Sound on Life
 Nominated for the Oxfam Global Justice Award, 2014 for Mission Rape - A Tool of War
 Nominated for Best European TV Programme of the Year, Prix Europa Iris, 2014 for Mission Rape - A Tool of War

See also
 Cinema of Denmark
 Danish Film Institute
 Women's cinema

References

External links
 Katia Forbert on IMDb
 Katia Forbert Petersen on the Danish Film Database (danish)

Danish cinematographers
Danish women cinematographers
Danish film directors
Danish women film directors
Danish documentary filmmakers
Polish cinematographers
Polish film directors
Polish women film directors
Polish documentary filmmakers
Living people
Women documentary filmmakers
1949 births